= Unics =

Unics or UnICS may refer to:

- Unix, originally Unics, computer operating system software
- BC UNICS, a Russian basketball club
